Liulin ( is a county of western Shanxi province, China, bordering Shaanxi province and the Yellow River to the west. It is under the administration of Lüliang city. The county is the site of the Xiangyan Temple (zh).

Liulin has been inhabited since the Neolithic era. During the Han dynasty the county seat was in Mengmen town. It is the birthplace of Lin Xiangru and Red Army general He Chang (贺昌). It has historically been a trade town between the Central Plains and the Silk Road.

It is a center of coal industry, jujube and walnut cultivation.

Its regional cuisines include Liulin Wantuan, a steamed buckwheat noodle, and sesame cakes.

Administrative divisions

Climate

References
www.xzqh.org

See also
Wang Ning, county party boss who was investigated for corruption

County-level divisions of Shanxi